The Mười hai Bà mụ (chữ Nôm: 邁台婆妈), or Thập nhị Bà thư (chữ Hán: 十二婆姐), "Twelve Midwives" also called Mẹ Sanh (or Mẹ Sinh, 媽生) are deities from Vietnamese mythology and folk religion. They are twelve fairies who teach babies various prosperous traits and skills such as sucking and smiling. In some parts of Vietnam when a baby is one month old a special ritual is performed for the "Twelve Midwives."

Mythology 
The mythology of 12 Bà Mụ was told by Nguyễn Đổng Chi in the book Lược Khảo Về Thần Thoại Việt Nam: The mythology of these 12 goddesses is now only vaguely known to us. There is a theory that it is the gods who helped the Ngọc Hoàng from the time he intended to create mankind. but there is also a theory that these are the gods entrusted by the Ngọc Hoàng after he created a sufficient number of people and things in the lower world. In other words, the 12 Bà mụ are gods who are responsible for shaping someone's body when ordered to reincarnate.

The number 12 Bà Mụ is often explained by a few different points of view: there is a view that it is a collective responsible for the creation of a human being, and another explanation is that each Bà Mụ takes care of a different person jobs: people who shape ears, people who shape eyes, people who shape limbs, people who teach children to laugh, people who teach children say. In the South of Vietnam, there is a concept that 12 Bà Mụ are 12 people who take turns taking care of maternity for 12 years, calculated according to the "thập nhị chi" - i.e. according to the 12 zodiac animals.

List of 12 Bà mụ 
A list of 12 midwives, each of whom holds a job in birth and foster care, including:

In some places there is an extra god called Kim Hoa Thánh Mẫu (Bà Chúa Thai Sanh) - the head of the 12 Bà Mụ should not be included in the list of 12 Bà Mụ.
 Thập Nhị Tiên Nương (12 Bà Mụ) including:
Mụ bà Trần Tứ Nương considers childbirth (chú sanh)
Mụ bà Vạn Tứ Nương considers pregnancy (chú thai)
Mụ bà Lâm Cửu Nương considers conception (thủ thai)
Mụ bà Lưu Thất Nương considers shaping male and female forms for the baby (chú nam nữ).
Mụ bà Lâm Nhất Nương considers the care of the fetus (an thai)
Mụ bà Lý Đại Nương considers labor (chuyển sanh)
Mụ bà Hứa Đại Nương considers the opening of flowers and pistils (hộ sản)
Mụ bà Cao Tứ Nương considers confinement (dưỡng sanh)
Mụ bà Tăng Ngũ Nương takes care of newborn babies (bảo tống)
Mụ bà Mã Ngũ Nương takes care of the baby's holding (tống tử)
Mụ bà Trúc Ngũ Nương considers take care of holding the baby (bảo tử)
Mụ bà Nguyễn Tam Nương considers witnessing and supervising the birth (giám sanh)

Customs 
12 Bà mụ are worshiped at a number of temples such as Hóc Ông Temple, Biên Hòa Temple, Phước Tường Thủ Đức Temple, Minh Hương Gia Thạnh Chợ Lớn Temple; in the family when a woman gives birth or child is sick, and is especially honored in the ritual of worshiping the Mụ (cúng Mụ) held when the child is full (three days old), fullmonth (born 1 month); my age (100 days of birth) and the end of the cradle (full years).

See also 
 Thirteen Đức Thầy

References

Vietnamese mythology
Vietnamese deities
Vietnamese gods